Tampa Bay History Center is a history museum in Tampa, Florida. Exhibits include coverage of the Tampa Bay area's first native inhabitants, Spanish conquistadors, and historical figures who shaped the area's history, as well as a reproduction of a 1920s cigar store. The museum is on the waterfront at 801 Water Street in Tampa's Channelside District. It opened on January 17, 2009.

The Tampa Bay History Center includes three floors of permanent and temporary exhibition space covering 12,000 years of Florida history, with a special focus on Tampa Bay and the Gulf Coast. The History Center has a museum store, classrooms, the Witt Research Center (a branch of the Tampa-Hillsborough County Public Library System), a map gallery, an event hall and the Columbia Cafe (a branch of Ybor City's Columbia Restaurant).

Tampa Bay History Center Timeline
Hillsborough County was 14 times its present size when it was established by the Florida Territorial Legislature in 1834. Its boundaries included all or part of 24 
present-day counties, stretching from Ocala to Lake Okeechobee and St. Petersburg to Orlando.

In the early 1880s, Tampa residents expressed concern that there was no organized effort to preserve and display local artifacts. In the January 19, 1882, issue of The Sunland Tribune, County Judge J. G. Knapp wrote, "... no time should be lost in snatching the historical artifacts from the waste and death of oblivion. Who shall do it?"

Fast forward 100 years: 
1986: The Hillsborough County Commission assembles a taskforce to explore the feasibility of creating a regional history museum.
1989: The History Museum of Tampa-Hillsborough County, Inc., a 501(c) 3 not-for-profit, is established by a group of private citizens led by Tampa businessman J. Thomas Touchton.
Mr. Touchton serves as chairman of the Board of Trustees until 2000.  
1993: A small museum space opens in the Shoppes of Harbour Island, showcasing objects from the museum's collection and from other local and statewide institutions.
1993: The History Museum of Tampa-Hillsborough County, Inc. officially changes its name to the Tampa Bay History Center (TBHC).
1995: The Hillsborough County Commission charges TBHC with the care, in perpetuity, of the County collection.
1996: TBHC moves to the Tampa Convention Center Annex on Franklin Street, serving the community with permanent and traveling exhibitions, public programs, tours, outreach, research assistance, and publications.
1998: The Hillsborough County Commission commits $17 million in Community Investment Tax funds toward the planning and construction of a new museum building for TBHC.
2000: Attorney George B. Howell III succeeds J. Thomas Touchton as Chairman of TBHC's board of trustees and continues the commitment of the board, staff, members, and volunteers to acquire a permanent home for the museum.
2004: Tampa and Hillsborough County leaders sign an agreement to build the new History Center in Cotanchobee-Fort Brooke Park on a 2.4-acre tract secured by the City of Tampa through a grant from the Florida Communities Trust.
February 2006: To complete the process of building the new museum, The Campaign to Create the Tampa Bay History Center Experience is authorized by the board of trustees.
September 2006: The Capital Campaign is launched, requiring the History Center to raise $28 million in private funds, $17 million more than its initial pledge of $11 million to the Hillsborough County Commission. Mr. Touchton chairs the campaign.
October 2007: Construction begins on the museum's new  home — Hillsborough County's first publicly owned LEED Certified "Green Building".
October 2007: Because of the success of the campaign and the need for an additional $4.5 million
to build out the new museum, the Board of Trustees agrees to increase the private campaign goal from $28 million to $32 million.  
March 2008: TBHC closes its museum space on Franklin Street to begin staging for the move into the new building.
June 2008: Local dignitaries, guests, board members, and staff gather with more than 200 construction workers to celebrate the last milestone of construction — the topping-out of the Tampa Bay History Center.
June 2008: The History Center receives word that it has been awarded a $1-million challenge grant from the prestigious Kresge Foundation to help build the museum and its exhibits. To receive the $1-million grant, the History Center must complete its fundraising campaign by April 1, 2009.
January 2009: The History Center celebrates the grand opening of its new facility.
March 2009: The History Center successfully meets the Kresge Challenge, raising $32 million in private contributions five days ahead of schedule.
October 2009: The History Center Building, which owned by Hillsborough County, is renamed the J. Thomas Touchton Tampa Bay History Center Building.
2012: The History Center becomes a Smithsonian Affiliate museum
2015: The History Center becomes accredited by the American Alliance of Museums
2018: The History Center opens new Treasure Seekers exhibit about Pirates, Conquistators & Shipwrecks

Exhibits

The museum's exhibition galleries explore 500 years of recorded history and 12,000 years of human habitation in the Tampa Bay region in its three floors of exhibitions.

Touchton Map Library 
The Touchton Map Library, which is the only cartographic center in the Southeast United States, is home to thousands of maps, charts, and other documents. The collection covers more than 500 years of cartography. The Library partners with University of South Florida Libraries to provide the general public with access to thousands of more maps. The collection is in the process of being digitized and can be viewed online.

Cuban Pathways  
This exhibit is a recent addition to the Tampa Bay History Center running until February 12, 2023, that details the shared history and experiences of Cuban migrants with Florida's history, and how Cuban culture has had on Floridian culture and the history of Cuba created by the people who lived and worked there amid various stages in the country's past. The exhibition is presented in both English and Spanish, and covers topics as sunny as vacations to the political strife that has shaped Cuba into the place it is today.

Treasure Seekers 
The Treasure Seekers Exhibit spans a good amount of the fourth floor of the museum, and offers patrons the ability to look at and engage with seafaring technology and practice of the past, including a section focusing on using recreations of astrolabes, devices that tracked celestial bodies to allow sailors and pirates alike the ability to find their way out on the sea. Pirates, conquistadors, and naval history are all explored in this exhibit, with interactive presentations like "The Pirate's Fate Theater" immersing guests on a voyage on the sea.

Programs 
Tampa Bay History Center offers docent-guided walking tours of Tampa's historic sites and neighborhoods. The tours last 90 minutes and cover about one mile. Two notable tours include Ybor City and Central Avenue East.

Tampa Bay History Center hosts a monthly book group focused on Florida literature. The event is free with registration. Florida Conversations is a free, monthly lecture series highlighting research into Florida history.

The Tampa Bay History Center features several activities for youth engagement, including Summer History Adventure Camps. Teen volunteers are enlisted to work as Summer Camp Counselors, providing a fun learning environment for kids. Teens are also recruited to serve on the Teen Council and as Educational Volunteers, where they assist with creating educational programming and events. Teens can gain educational assistance through AP Trivia Nights, which covers a variety of topics relevant to high school Advanced Placement courses.

References

External links

History centers
History of Tampa, Florida
History museums in Florida
Museums established in 2009
Museums in Tampa, Florida
2009 establishments in Florida
Florida Native American Heritage Trail